Green River refers to two rivers in the US state of Washington:

Green River (Duwamish River)
Green River (North Fork Toutle River)